Centre of Excellence in Wireless Technology (Cewit) is a nonprofit autonomous research society of IIT Madras set up to develop indigenous world-class next generation wireless technology. The organization is set up with support from Ministry of Communication and IT and the Indian telecom industry.

Overview
CEWiT research on broadband wireless technologies addressing a wide range of issues relating to air interface, core network & services and actively contributing to 4G and 5G wireless standards, 3GPP LTE, LTE-Advanced, NR and IEEE 802.16m WiMAX.

In 2018, CEWiT along with Indian Institute of Technology Madras, Indian Institute of Technology Kanpur, Indian Institute of Technology Delhi, Indian Institute of Technology Hyderabad, Society for Applied Microwave Electronics Engineering and Research, and Indian Institute of Science received fund from Department of Telecommunications, India to build the indigenous 5G testbed for indian telecom market. This test bed will be built in multiple stages and will be ready by 2021.

CEWiT has been granted more than 21 US patents and many patents are in queue.

External links

References

Wireless
Research institutes in Chennai
Research institutes established in 2004
2004 establishments in Tamil Nadu